The Joseph Manigault House is a historic house museum in Charleston, South Carolina that is owned and operated by the Charleston Museum.  Built in 1803, it was designed by Gabriel Manigault to be the home of his brother, and is nationally significant as a well-executed and preserved example of Adam style architecture.  It was declared a National Historic Landmark in 1973.

Description and history

The Manigault House is located near the center of the Charleston peninsula, at the corner of Meeting and John Streets.  It is a three-story brick structure, set on a raised brick foundation.  The main facade has a two-story porch across the center three bays, with elaborate doorways on both floors featuring slender pilasters and sidelight windows.  A semicircular stairwell projects from one sidewall, and a bowed porch from the other, giving the house the rough shape of a parallelogram.  The interior features delicately refined woodwork in its fireplace mantels, door and window moulding, and cornices, reflective of the style promoted by Robert Adam, which differentiated the scale of these elements in domestic and civic architecture.  The gatehouse standing near the property entrance is an architectural folly.

The house was built in 1803 for Joseph Manigault to a design by his brother Gabriel.  Gabriel Manigault had studied architecture in London before the American Revolutionary War, and was familiar with Robert Adam's design principles.  This was the first major work of his to exhibit these principles, and was also one of the first houses in Charleston that was not obviously based on the standard "single house" and double house" models then commonly used.  The house also includes a number of construction elements designed to minimize problems with pests.

Manigault's executor sold the house in 1852 to George N. Reynolds, Jr., before it was passed onto John S. Riggs in 1864. In 1920, the house was threatened with demolition to make way for a gas station.  In response, a group of Charlestonians organized a preservation group which would become the Preservation Society of Charleston.

See also
List of National Historic Landmarks in South Carolina
National Register of Historic Places listings in Charleston, South Carolina

References

External links
Joseph Manigault House, at The Charleston Museum
Joseph Manigault House, Charleston County (350 Meeting St., Charleston), at South Carolina Department of Archives and History

National Historic Landmarks in South Carolina
Houses on the National Register of Historic Places in South Carolina
Houses completed in 1790
Museums in Charleston, South Carolina
Historic house museums in South Carolina
National Register of Historic Places in Charleston, South Carolina
Houses in Charleston, South Carolina
Historic district contributing properties in South Carolina